The National Organization of the Workers of São Tomé and Príncipe – Central Union (ONTSTP-CS) is a national trade union center in São Tomé and Príncipe.

The ONTSTP-CS is affiliated with the International Trade Union Confederation.

References

External links
 ONTSTP-CS at the UGT.

Trade unions in São Tomé and Príncipe
International Trade Union Confederation